Diana M. Vogel (1926–2013), known professionally as D. H. Melhem, was an American poet, novelist, and editor.

Life
She was born in Brooklyn, New York, the daughter of Nicholas Melhem and Georgette Deyrataui Melhem, both immigrants from Lebanon. She graduated from New York University cum laude and received her master's degree and a doctoral degree in English and American Literature from City College. 
She was a longtime resident of New York City, where her two children were born and raised. Melhem moved to Long Beach, California, in 2012, and lived there until her death on June 15, 2013.

Melhem was a close personal friend of Pulitzer Prize-winning Poet Gwendolyn Brooks, about whom she wrote a biography, Gwendolyn Brooks: Poetry and the Heroic Voice.

Awards
 1991 American Book Award

Works

Poetry
 
 
 Poems for You (P&Q Press, 2000)
 Of Country (CCC, 1998)

Novels

Anthologies
 
 
 Long Island Island Sounds (NSPS Press)

Criticism

References

External links
"Author's website"

People from Brooklyn
New York University alumni
City College of New York alumni
Graduate Center, CUNY alumni
American Book Award winners